The New Hazlett Theater is the primary occupant of the Carnegie Free Library of Allegheny in the Allegheny Center part of Pittsburgh, Pennsylvania. After the Pittsburgh Public Theater moved to the O'Reilly Theater in 1999, the Hazlett Theater was transformed into the New Hazlett Theater and opened in 2004. Since 2013, the Theater has also been home to the Community Supported Art (CSA) Performance Series, designed to help support new and upcoming artists in the Pittsburgh area.

History
The Carnegie Free Library of Allegheny featured the first Carnegie Music Hall in the United States. The Theatre was renovated in 1967 with community-raised money when it was under threat of demolition. In 1980, it was renamed the Hazlett Theater in honor of Theodore L. Hazlett Jr. The Hazlett Theater served as the home to Pittsburgh Public Theater For 24 seasons from 1974 until 1999 when the PPT moved to the O'Reilly Theater. Due to the decline of traffic, the local arts community supported the rebirth of the Hazlett Theater as the New Hazlett Theater in 2004, where it serves as a valued community resource for performing artists in the Pittsburgh area.

References

External links
 

Theatres in Pittsburgh
2004 establishments in Pennsylvania